Crassispira tuckeri is an extinct species of sea snail, a marine gastropod mollusk in the family Pseudomelatomidae, the turrids and allies. Fossils have been found in Eocene strata in the Paris Basin, France.

Crassispira tuckeri Bonfitto & Morassi, 2004 is an invalid junior homonym; Crassispira tuckerana is a replacement name.

References

 Cossmann (M.) & Pissarro (G.), 1913 Iconographie complète des coquilles fossiles de l'Éocène des environs de Paris, t. 2, p. pl. 46-65
 Le Renard (J.), 1994 Révision des Mollusques paléogènes du Bassin de Paris. 1 - Rectifications de nomenclature d'espèces. Cossmanniana, t. 3, vol. 2, p. 35-40
 Le Renard (J.) & Pacaud (J.-M.), 1995 Révision des Mollusques paléogènes du Bassin de Paris. 2 - Liste des références primaires des espèces. Cossmanniana, t. 3, vol. 3, p. 65-132

External links
 Pacaud J.M. & Le Renard J. (1995). Révision des Mollusques paléogènes du Bassin de Paris. IV- Liste systématique actualisée. Cossmanniana. 3(4): 151-187

tuckeri
Gastropods described in 1994